The 1989 International Formula 3000 Championship was contested over 10 rounds. Jean Alesi won the title, while also competing in the last half of the Formula One season for Tyrrell.

Season summary

The season began with Thomas Danielsson winning at Silverstone, after returning from the eye problems that had caused him to miss most of the previous year.

Martin Donnelly then won on the road at Vallelunga, but was disqualified. His Eddie Jordan Racing team had modified the Reynard's nosecone, but it had not been subjected to the mandatory crash test.

At the Pau Grand Prix, Éric Bernard led the two EJR cars of Jean Alesi and Donnelly after an aborted first start. However, Bernard was caught behind an accident involving Paul Belmondo and stalled his car, allowing Alesi to go through and take the victory. Bernard stormed back through the field, but collided with Mark Blundell while battling for second place. Bernard would win the next race at Jerez. Andrea Chiesa then won a close race on the dusty Enna circuit.

Meanwhile, three F3000 regulars—Alesi, Bernard and Donnelly—all made their Formula One debuts at the French Grand Prix in July. Alesi was particularly impressive for Tyrrell, finishing fourth, and he would continue to drive for them when the F3000 schedule allowed.

The EJR team won the next three races, allowing Alesi to take a commanding lead in the championship. His closest rival Érik Comas won at Le Mans but Alesi's single point, along with the tiebreaker of most wins, meant that he clinched the title. Alesi then skipped the last round in at Dijon-Prenois to race in the Japanese Grand Prix, allowing Comas to tie his point total with the win.

Drivers and teams

Calendar

Notes

1 JJ Lehto set the fastest race lap, but was disqualified after the race for having an illegal rev-limiter.
2 Martin Donnelly won on the road, but was disqualified for using a nosecone that had not been subjected to the mandatory crash test.

Final points standings

Driver

For every race points were awarded: 9 points to the winner, 6 for runner-up, 4 for third place, 3 for fourth place, 2 for fifth place and 1 for sixth place.

Jean Alesi won the championship by virtue of having three wins to Érik Comas' two. He skipped the last race of the season with the championship already won.

Complete overview

R = retired, NS = did not start, NQ = did not qualify, DIS = disqualified (placing before disqualification displayed alongside in parentheses)

References

International Formula 3000
International Formula 3000 seasons